Faggioli is an Italian surname. Notable people with the surname include:

Alessandro Faggioli (born 2000), Italian footballer
Massimo Faggioli (born 1970), Italian church historian
Michelangelo Faggioli (1666–1733), Italian lawyer and classical composer

Italian-language surnames